Emanuele Macaluso (21 March 1924 – 19 January 2021) was an Italian trade unionist, politician, and journalist.

Biography 
In 1941, Macaluso joined the clandestine Communist Party of Italy (PCdI; after 1943 known as the Italian Communist Party, or PCI) and took part in the Sicilian trade union movement, and from 1947 to 1956, he was regional secretary of the Italian General Confederation of Labour.

In 1958, once elected to the Sicilian Regional Assembly, Macaluso was one of the creators of so-called "milazzismo", named after Silvio Milazzo, elected president of the Sicilian Region, which led to the birth of a regional government supported by communists, socialists, monarchists and the Italian Social Movement. Macaluso's work was applauded by Palmiro Togliatti himself.

In the party, Macaluso was a member of the wing called migliorismo, together with the future President of Italy Giorgio Napolitano, and in 1963 he was elected to the Chamber of Deputies, holding the seat until 1976, when he was elected to the Senate; he left the Parliament in 1992. In those years, he was a member of the PCI’s Political Secretariat under Palmiro Togliatti, Luigi Longo and Enrico Berlinguer.

From 1982 to 1986, Macaluso was editor-in-chief of L'Unità.

Macaluso was always critical of the centre-left Democratic Party which was formed in 2007, accusing it of lacking a strong identity.

He died on 19 January 2021 at the age of 96.

References

External links 
Files about his parliamentary activities (in Italian): IV, V, VI, VII, VIII, IX, X legislature.

1924 births
2021 deaths
People from Caltanissetta
Italian Communist Party politicians
20th-century Italian politicians
21st-century Italian politicians
Politicians from the Province of Caltanissetta
L'Unità editors